Dooram is a 2016 Indian Malayalam-language romantic comedy film  directed by Manu Kannamthanam starring Maqbool Salmaan, Shine Tom Chacko and Bhagath Manuel. Twin sisters Aina Elsmy Sebastian and Aima Rosmy Sebastian played the female leads.

Plot
Dennis, Sam, Sameer and Shanavas are four close college-friends. Dennis is in a relationship with Ann Mariya and Sameer is with Rasiya while Sam does not believe in love. After college Dennis splits with Ann but Sameer and Rasiya end up married. Dennis is now a business consultant and meets Riti Sathyanarayanan during a business trip and was surprised by her similarity with Ann and tries to get close to her. What happens next form the story.

Cast

Production
The film was first named Love and Love Only which was later changed to Dooram. It was shot in Malaysia, Hyderabad and in various places in Kochi.

References

External links

2016 films
2010s Malayalam-language films